Raiquan Clark (born January 1, 1996) is an American basketball player for Panthers Schwenningen of the ProA. He played college basketball for the LIU Sharks and the LIU Brooklyn Blackbirds, leaving as the program's all-time leading scorer.

High school career
Clark attended Hillhouse High School in New Haven, Connecticut. In his junior season, he won the Class LL state championship. As a senior, he averaged 15.2 points, 7.5 rebounds, three assists and three steals per game. He also led Hillhouse to a Southern Connecticut Conference Hammonasset Division title and was a two-time New Haven Register All-Area selection. Clark did not receive any NCAA Division I scholarship offers after his senior season and attended Trinity-Pawling School in Pawling, New York for a postgraduate year to gain more interest. He helped his team achieve a 17–6 record and a New England Preparatory School Athletic Council quarterfinals berth. Clark did not hold any Division I offers by the end of the season. He sent emails, including his highlights and statistics, to over 1,000 coaches representing every Division I program but failed to draw an offer.

College career
As a freshman, Clark played for LIU Brooklyn as a preferred walk-on but vowed to his mother, Shontay Watts, that he would eventually earn a scholarship. In his only appearance, he played two minutes in a loss to Dartmouth. As a sophomore, he was awarded a full scholarship and averaged 6.2 points and 4.2 rebounds per game. On November 10, 2017, Clark scored a career-high 34 points in a 102–96 loss to Tulane. In his junior season, he averaged 17.3 points and seven rebounds per game, earning Third Team All-Northeast Conference (NEC) honors. He led LIU Brooklyn to the 2018 NEC tournament championship, scoring 20 points in a 71–61 victory over top-seeded Wagner, and an appearance in the NCAA Tournament. As a senior, Clark averaged an NEC-high 18.9 points, 6.7 rebounds and two assists per game and was named to the First Tetam All-NEC. On February 8, 2020, he passed Jamal Olasewere to become the all-time leading scorer for LIU and LIU Brooklyn. In his redshirt senior season at LIU, Clark averaged 19.5 points and 7.3 rebounds per game, leading the NEC in scoring and making the First Team All-NEC for a second straight year. He became the seventh player in NEC history to record at least 2,000 career points.

Professional career
In June 2021, Clark signed his first professional contract with Panthers Schwenningen of the German ProA.

References

External links
LIU Brooklyn Blackbirds bio
LIU Sharks bio

1996 births
Living people
American expatriate basketball people in Germany
American men's basketball players
Basketball players from New Haven, Connecticut
Shooting guards
Small forwards
LIU Brooklyn Blackbirds men's basketball players